Xikou may refer to several towns:

China
 Xikou, in Fenghua District, Ningbo, Zhejiang Province
 Xikou, Longyou County, in Longyou County, Zhejiang Province
 Xikou, Xiushui County, in Xiushui County, Jiangxi Province
 Xikou, Xiuning County, in Xiuning County, Anhui Province
 Xikou, Xuancheng, in Xuanzhou District, Xuancheng, Anhui Province
 Xikou, Cili County, in Cili County, Hunan Province
 Xikou, Tongdao,  a town in Tongdao Dong Autonomous County, Hunan Province
 Xikou, Huaying, in Huaying City, Sichuan Province
 Xikou, Jianning County, in Jianning County, Fujian Province

Taiwan
 Xikou, Chiayi, a rural township in Chiayi County
 Xikou, Hualien, a village in Shoufeng, Hualien, and location of the TRA's